Ashley Peternella (born in Oranjestad, Aruba - June 27, 1992) is a Aruban TV presenter for OUTtv, former Mister World Netherlands 2019 and Mr Gay Aruba.

Television 
On June 30, 2019, Ashley appeared in the Dutch version of The Big Audition on NPO3. He was auditioning for the role of TV presenter for the European Gay Lifestyle network OUTtv. Ashley was named one of the winners of the audition and was offered a contract with the network.

Mr Gay World 
As Mr Gay Aruba he competed in the Mr Gay World 2013 competition held in Antwerp, Belgium. He placed as 3rd runner-up and won the sports challenge award.

UM Sportsman of the Year 
In 2012 he won the UM Sportsman of the year award for winning the Latin Champions category of the 48th edition of the ETDS,

and for winning 3 gold medals at the NSTB 2012 Dutch Championship.

References 

1992 births
Living people